Tanya Haden Black (born October 11, 1971) is an American artist, musician, and singer. She is one of the triplet daughters of jazz bassist Charlie Haden. She is married to actor, comedian and musician Jack Black.

Career
Born in New York City, she was a member of several bands, including Let's Go Sailing, and is the creator of the Imaginary Bear puppet show. She has contributed to recordings of a number of Los Angeles musicians, including vocals and cello on Par Avion's EP, Pop Music United. She is the daughter of the jazz double bassist Charlie Haden; the triplet sister of bassist Rachel Haden and violinist Petra Haden, with whom she has performed as the Haden Triplets; and the sister of bassist-singer Josh Haden, leader of the group Spain.

She received her MFA degree from California Institute of the Arts, where she majored in experimental animation. She continues her work in visual art and has exhibited in several shows including one at the Las Cienegas Projects in 2010. In 2015, Haden was picked up by Rosamund Felsen Gallery where she had a one-artist exhibition showing drawings.

Haden plays cello extensively in the Los Angeles area including performing as an additional member of the band Silversun Pickups. She also plays the cello on their Pikul EP, which was released in 2005. Haden has also recorded with the Los Angeles indie folk band Sea Wolf and played cello on Los Angeles based rock band The Warlocks album Surgery in 2005.

Tanya, with her sisters Petra and Rachel, known as The Haden Triplets, released their first album on February 4, 2014. The album includes the sisters singing in harmony. The record was produced by Ry Cooder and also features the sisters on their respective instruments. The album is being released on Third Man Records which was founded by musician Jack White.

Personal life 
Haden met actor Jack Black when they were students at Crossroads School, a private high school in Santa Monica. Although the two attended the private high school together, they did not begin dating until spring 2005. The two married on March 14, 2006, in Big Sur, California. She gave birth to their first son on June 10, 2006 at Cedars-Sinai Medical Center in Los Angeles. Their second son was born on May 23, 2008.

According to Aaron Freeman (Gene Ween), the Ween song "Stay Forever" was written for Haden.

References

External links 

1971 births
Living people
American cellists
Women cellists
Singers from New York City
California Institute of the Arts alumni
Crossroads School alumni
Triplets
21st-century American singers
21st-century American women singers
21st-century cellists